A stressed ribbon bridge (also stress-ribbon bridge or catenary bridge) is a tension structure (similar in many ways to a simple suspension bridge). The suspension cables are embedded in the deck, which follows a catenary arc between supports. Unlike the simple span, the ribbon is stressed in traction, which adds to the stiffness of the structure (simple suspension spans tend to sway and bounce). The supports in turn sustain upward-thrusting arcs that allow the grade to be changed between spans (where multiple spans are used). Such bridges are typically made from concrete reinforced by steel tensioning cables. Where such bridges carry vehicle traffic, a certain degree of stiffness is required to prevent excessive flexure of the structure, obtained by stressing the concrete in compression.

Examples

 Leonel Viera Bridge, Uruguay - the first stressed ribbon bridge ever built. Designed and built by engineer Lionel Viera. Completed in 1965.
 Phyllis J. Tilley Memorial Bridge - a hybrid concrete arch/stressed ribbon bridge across the Trinity River in Fort Worth, Texas.
 Rogue River Pedestrian Bridge - a pedestrian-pipeline bridge across the Rogue River at Grants Pass, Oregon.
 Langur Way Canopy Walk - located in The Habitat atop Penang Hill in Penang, Malaysia, this is the world’s highest-altitude stressed ribbon bridge (800m above sea level) as well as being the only one in a tropical rainforest.

Notes

References

External links

 List of stressed ribbon bridges, Structurae
 Structurae: Image of one of the two Maldonado stressed ribbon bridges
 Tourist article containing a reference to the above bridge (the Maldonado bridge)
 Spanish language site concerning the works of Don Leonel Viera

Bridges by structural type